Gri is a programming language for creating scientific graphics. It is licensed under the terms of the GNU General Public License.

Some users consider Gri similar to LaTeX, since both provide extensive power as a reward for tolerating a learning curve.

Gri can make x-y graphs, contour graphs, and image graphs, outputting the results in PostScript format. Control is provided over all aspects of drawing, e.g. line widths, colors, and fonts. A limited TeX-like syntax provides common mathematical symbols.

An example Gri program:
open file.dat
read columns x y
draw curve

See also
gnuplot

External links 
 Gri homepage at Sourceforge
 Article on Gri in LinuxJournal magazine, July 2000

Plotting software
Earth sciences graphics software